Golden Square (Золотой Квадрат; Zolotoi Kvadrat) is a neighbourhood located in the city center of Almaty, Kazakhstan. It is considered a historical point in Almaty, and numerous prominent governmental buildings are currently located there. The area was originally a prominent area for Almaty's elite social classes, and numerous known poets, politicians, and musicians lived there. The architecture in the area includes Stalin-era houses with neo-Russian ornamentation and pastel-colored fronts. The square is bordered by the streets Jeltoqsan, Bogenbai, Kunaev, and Abai. The area also includes parks and public gardens, fountains, as well as restaurants and entertainment centers.

See also

 Almaty

References

Squares in Almaty